Paulo Ricardo Ribeiro de Jesus Machado (born 31 March 1986) is a Portuguese former professional footballer who played as a central midfielder.

Formed at Porto, he amassed Primeira Liga totals of 103 matches and eight goals over five seasons, in representation of as many clubs. He also competed professionally in France, Greece, Croatia and India, winning the national championship twice each with Olympiacos and Dinamo Zagreb.

Machado won four caps for Portugal, making his first appearance in 2010.

Club career

Porto
Born in the Porto neighbourhood of Bairro do Cerco, where he was surrounded by deviant behaviours from an early age, Machado joined FC Porto's youth system at the age of 14.  He made his first-team debut in the sixth round of the Taça de Portugal on 21 January 2004, under José Mourinho; he came on as a substitute for Sérgio Conceição, who had just concluded the 4–0 win over U.D. Vilafranquense at the Estádio das Antas. In the summer of 2005 he signed an improved contract until 2010 along with teammate Bruno Vale, before both went on consecutive loans to C.F. Estrela da Amadora and U.D. Leiria.

Machado was loaned again in the following two years, first to Leixões S.C. and then to Ligue 1 club AS Saint-Étienne. Alongside teammates Diogo Valente and Vieirinha, also loaned by Porto, he was instrumental as the Matosinhos side retained their Primeira Liga status at the season's close.

On 10 July 2008, Machado was loaned to the French club as part of the deal that brought Colombian Fredy Guarín to Porto. He adapted well, becoming an integral part of Saint-Étienne's campaign, scoring twice in his first 16 games – 12 as a starter – and only missing three league matches as they narrowly avoided relegation.

Toulouse and Olympiacos
On 2 July 2009, Toulouse FC signed Machado to a four-year deal. In August 2012, after three seasons in which he averaged 30 appearances and four goals, he joined Olympiacos F.C. in Greece for €2,700,000 on a three-year contract. He scored his first goal for his new team on 3 November, also providing an assist to Kostas Mitroglou in a 2–0 home win against OFI Crete FC.

Dinamo Zagreb
Machado joined GNK Dinamo Zagreb on 4 June 2014, on a three-year contract for an undisclosed fee. He won a league and cup double in his first season, equalising in a 2–1 home win over HNK Rijeka in the semi-finals on 8 April, followed by the winning attempt in the penalty shootout at the end of the goalless final against RNK Split on 20 May.

On 28 July 2015, during a UEFA Champions League play-off round against Molde FK at Stadion Maksimir, club fans booed Machado as he walked off the pitch while being substituted after a poor performance. In return, he made several obscene gestures for which he received a straight red card, being subsequently suspended until further notice. Sharing teams with compatriots Eduardo and Gonçalo Santos, he won a second consecutive double, starting in the 2–1 cup final win over NK Slaven Belupo on 10 May.

Later years
On 2 September 2017, free agent Machado signed with recently promoted C.D. Aves until the end of the season. On 31 August 2018, he joined Indian Super League franchise Mumbai City FC; after suffering an injury in the second half of the match against Jamshedpur FC on 19 December 2019, he was ruled out for the rest of the campaign.

Machado returned to Leixões following 12 years away in September 2020. In his one season back at the Estádio do Mar, he played just under half the fixtures and scored an added-time winner as a late substitute against Académico de Viseu F.C. on 28 February.

In June 2021, Machado retired from playing. He went immediately into being assistant manager at his final club's under-23 team.

International career
Machado was part of the Portugal under-21 team at the 2007 UEFA European Championship. Previously, he won the Under-17 European Championships in 2003.

On 30 September 2010, Machado was called up for the first time to the senior side by newly appointed coach Paulo Bento. He did not make his debut in either of the two UEFA Euro 2012 qualifiers that were scheduled, but later spoke of his smooth integration into the squad and his ambition to eventually earn a regular place in the national team. On 17 November he finally made his debut, coming on for Nani in the dying minutes of a 4–0 friendly win over Spain, in Lisbon.

Career statistics

Club

International

Honours

Club
Olympiacos
Super League Greece: 2012–13, 2013–14
Greek Football Cup: 2012–13

Dinamo Zagreb
Croatian First Football League: 2014–15, 2015–16
Croatian Football Cup: 2014–15, 2015–16

Aves
Taça de Portugal: 2017–18

International
Portugal
UEFA European Under-17 Championship: 2003

References

External links

1986 births
Living people
Footballers from Porto
Portuguese footballers
Association football midfielders
Primeira Liga players
Liga Portugal 2 players
Segunda Divisão players
Padroense F.C. players
FC Porto B players
FC Porto players
C.F. Estrela da Amadora players
U.D. Leiria players
Leixões S.C. players
C.D. Aves players
Ligue 1 players
AS Saint-Étienne players
Toulouse FC players
Super League Greece players
Olympiacos F.C. players
Croatian Football League players
GNK Dinamo Zagreb players
Indian Super League players
Mumbai City FC players
Portugal youth international footballers
Portugal under-21 international footballers
Portugal international footballers
Portuguese expatriate footballers
Expatriate footballers in France
Expatriate footballers in Greece
Expatriate footballers in Croatia
Expatriate footballers in India
Portuguese expatriate sportspeople in France
Portuguese expatriate sportspeople in Greece
Portuguese expatriate sportspeople in Croatia
Portuguese expatriate sportspeople in India